Count Hervé Budes de Guébriant (20 August 1880 – 30 June 1972) was a French agricultural engineer.

Life

Hervé Budes de Guébriant was born in Saint-Pol-de-Léon, Brittany, in 1880.
He was the eldest son of Alain de Guébriant, an aristocrat and large landowner who was mayor and general councilor of the town.
He decided to become expert in agriculture, and obtained a diploma from the National Institute of Agronomy in Paris in 1903. 
He adopted the ideas of social Catholicism, and in 1911 he founded the first agricultural mutual accident insurance fund.
He favored the creation of municipal unions led by a peasant elite committed to developing Breton agriculture.
After World War I (1914–18) he became president of the fund.
From 1919 to 1941 he chaired the Office Central de Landerneau, which later became Triskalia, a Breton agricultural cooperative.

Hervé de Guébriant initiated an agrarian revival in the inter-war period to compensate for the loss of political influence of the monarchists and to revive the social and political engagement of the great aristocratic families.
He became a leading figure in French agriculture, and in 1927 was elected first president of the Chambre d’Agriculture du Finistère.
Pierre Caziot appointed the Commission d'Organization Corporative (COC) on 21 January 1941 as an agency to construct the Peasant Corporation.
The commission was headed by Hervé de Guébriant, and was mostly made up of leading conservative landowners.
It took nearly two years to develop the legislation that became effective on 16 December 1942.

Budes de Guébriant was imprisoned in November 1944 for collaboration with the Germans.
He was released in August 1945 for lack of sufficient evidence.
He died in Saint-Pol-de-Léon on 30 June 1972 at the age of 91.

Publications 

 Deux conférences sur l'évolution agricole en Bretagne sous l'égide du Bleun-brug. 1953.

References

Sources

1880 births
1972 deaths
French agronomists
20th-century French engineers